Séamus Power (born 1929 in Waterford, Ireland, died 25 June 2016) was an Irish hurler who played for his local club Mount Sion and at senior level for the Waterford county team in the 1950s and 1960s. He first appeared in a Waterford jersey when he played at full-forward for the Waterford minor hurling team defeated by Cork in 1946 and he first played for the senior team in 1949 against Limerick when he came on as a substitute for Davy Power. He was playing for the Roscrea club at that time as he was working there for the Post Office.

On his transfer back to the Waterford Post Office he played for the Mount Sion club where he became one of its greatest players, captaining two championship winning teams; hurling in 1958 and football in 1959. His mid-field partnership with Philly Grimes is reckoned to be one of the greatest of all time. He was also a footballer of considerable merit and represented Waterford for a number of years.

Long after his playing days were over he was selected at centre-field, alongside Philly Grimes, on the Waterford Centenary Team 1984 and the Waterford Millennium Team 2000.

Achievements
He won three county minor medals with Mount Sion in 1945-47 and as a senior won a further sixteen county senior championship medals - twelve for hurling and four for football.  All his senior medals were won in a period of just thirteen years. He was one of the greatest of that golden generation of Mount Sion players that carried all before them. They defeated all-comers from all the hurling counties and were the backbone of the great Waterford county side from 1957-63 providing six players to that team: Martin Og Morrissey, Séamus Power, Philly Grimes, Mick Flannelly, Frankie Walsh and Larry Guinan.

He won one senior All-Ireland medal, one National League, one Oireachtas, three Munster and six Railway Cup medals. He was trainer, coach and selector to the county senior hurling team for a number of years and held similar positions with the Mount Sion club. He was also one of the top referees in hurling and was in charge of the National League final in New York in the 1960s.

Administration
He was secretary of the Mount Sion club from 1955 until 1969 and then, in 1970, he took over as club chairman from Pat Fanning when the latter became GAA president. He later became one of Waterford's representatives on both the Munster Council and the GAA Central Council.

Honours

Waterford
All-Ireland Senior Hurling Championship:
Winner (1): 1959
Runner-up (2): 1957, 1963
Munster Senior Hurling Championship:
Winner (3): 1957, 1959, 1963
Runner-up (3): 1958, 1962, 1966
National Hurling League:
Winner (1): 1963
Runner-up (2): 1959, 1961,

Munster
Railway Cup:
Winner (5): 1955, 1958, 1959, 1960, 1961
Runner-up (2): 1956, 1962,

References

|http://www.wlrfm.com/wlrfm-podcasts/on-this-day-podcasts/117317-tuesday-aug-23rd-german-bomber-crash-lands-at-carriglong-1942.html=http://wikipedia.com

1929 births
2016 deaths
All-Ireland Senior Hurling Championship winners
Gaelic games club administrators
Mount Sion hurlers
Munster inter-provincial hurlers
Waterford County Board administrators
Waterford inter-county hurlers